Eldar Topić (born 29 May 1983 in Bosanska Dubica, Yugoslavia) is a Bosnian retired footballer.

Playing career

Club
Topić spent his entire career playing on different levels of the Austrian football pyramid, most notably with Vienna powerhouses Rapid and Austria.

Managerial career
In July 2016, Topić SV Wimpassing. On 3 April 2017, he was appointed player-manager of the club. In February 2018, he was replaced by Milivoj Vujanovic, but Topić continued at the club as a player-assistant. However, he announced in May 2018, that he would leave the club at the end of the season.

Topić' next coaching experience came in June 2019, where he was appointed player-manager of ASK Trumau. In November 2019 it was confirmed, that he would leave Trumau at the end of 2019 to become the assistant manager of FCM Traiskirchen. However, he left his position about three weeks into 2020, to join SC Wiener Neustadt where he was going to work as an individual coach for the U15 and U17 teams, and also play for the club's second/amateur team.

In the summer 2020, he became head coach of ASK Ebreichsdorf's U16s.

References

External links
Eldar Topić at sport.de

1983 births
Living people
People from Dubica, Bosnia and Herzegovina
Association football forwards
Bosnia and Herzegovina footballers
SV Mattersburg players
FC Lustenau players
SK Sturm Graz players
SK Rapid Wien players
SC Austria Lustenau players
SKN St. Pölten players
FK Austria Wien players
First Vienna FC players
SKU Amstetten players
Austrian Football Bundesliga players
2. Liga (Austria) players
Austrian Regionalliga players
Bosnia and Herzegovina expatriate footballers
Expatriate footballers in Austria
Bosnia and Herzegovina expatriate sportspeople in Austria
Bosnia and Herzegovina football managers